The Etape du Dales is a cyclosportive held in May each year, in the Yorkshire Dales in the UK. It was originally established as an alternative to the oversubscribed Fred Whitton Challenge; like the Fred Whitton, the Etape du Dales is a long day's ride over steep hills, and the proceeds go to charity - the Dave Rayner fund.

Raynet provide communications support.

Route
The Etape du Dales route is considered challenging.

The route starts and finishes at Wharfedale rugby club in Grassington. The route has varied slightly over time, but now includes Fleet Moss, Tan Hill Inn (the highest pub in England), Buttertubs Pass, and Coal Road.

A shorter, gentler route, known as the Presidents Ride, is also available.

Fastest times

See also
Fred Whitton Challenge

References

External links
Etape du Dales
Dave Rayner fund

Cyclosportives in the United Kingdom
Yorkshire Dales
Cycling in Yorkshire